Dietary factors are recognized as having a significant effect on the risk of cancers, with different dietary elements both increasing and reducing risk. Diet and obesity may be related to up to 30–35% of cancer deaths, while physical inactivity appears to be related to 7% risk of cancer occurrence. One review in 2011 suggested that total caloric intake influences cancer incidence and possibly progression.

While many dietary recommendations have been proposed to reduce the risk of cancer, few have significant supporting scientific evidence. Obesity and drinking alcohol have been correlated with the incidence and progression of some cancers. Lowering the drinking of beverages sweetened with sugar is recommended as a measure to address obesity. A diet low in fruits and vegetables and high in red meat has been implicated but not confirmed, and the effect may be small for well-nourished people who maintain a healthy weight.

Some specific foods are linked to specific cancers.  Studies have linked eating red or processed meat to an increased risk of breast cancer, colon cancer, prostate cancer, and pancreatic cancer, which may be partially explained by the presence of carcinogens in foods cooked at high temperatures. Aflatoxin B1, a frequent food contaminant, increases risk of liver cancer, while drinking coffee is associated with a reduced risk. Betel nut chewing causes oral cancer. Stomach cancer is more common in Japan due to its high-salt diet. Immigrant communities tend to develop the risk of their new country, often within one generation, suggesting a substantial link between diet and cancer.

Dietary recommendations for cancer prevention typically include weight management and eating "mainly vegetables, fruit, whole grains and fish, and a reduced intake of red meat, animal fat, and refined sugar."

Types of diet

Restrictive diets 

A number of diets and diet-based regimes are claimed to be useful against cancer. Popular types of "anti-cancer" diets include the Breuss diet, Gerson therapy, the Budwig protocol and the macrobiotic diet. None of these diets has been found to be effective, and some of them have been found to be harmful.

Dietary patterns 

Nutritional epidemiologists use multivariate statistics, such as principal components analysis and factor analysis, to measure how patterns of dietary behavior influence the risk of developing cancer. (The most well-studied dietary pattern is the mediterranean diet.) Based on their dietary pattern score, epidemiologists categorize people into quantiles. To estimate the influence of dietary behavior on risk of cancer, they measure the association between quantiles and the distribution of cancer prevalence (in case-control studies) and cancer incidence (in longitudinal studies). They usually include other variables in their statistical model to account for the other differences between people with and without cancer (confounders). For breast cancer, there is a replicated trend for women with a more "prudent or healthy" diet, i.e. higher in fruits and vegetables, to have a lower risk of cancer. A "drinker dietary pattern" is also associated with higher breast cancer risk, while the association is inconsistent between a more westernized diet and elevated risk of breast cancer. Pickled foods are linked with cancer.

Dietary components

Alcohol

Alcohol is associated with an increased risk of a number of cancers. 3.6% of all cancer cases and 3.5% of cancer deaths worldwide are attributable to drinking of alcohol. Breast cancer in women is linked with alcohol intake. Alcohol also increases the risk of cancers of the mouth, esophagus, pharynx and larynx, colorectal cancer, liver cancer, stomach and ovaries. The International Agency for Research on Cancer (Centre International de Recherche sur le Cancer) of the World Health Organization has classified alcohol as a Group 1 carcinogen. Its evaluation states, "There is sufficient evidence for the carcinogenicity of alcoholic beverages in humans. ... Alcoholic beverages are carcinogenic to humans (Group 1)."

Processed and red meat
On October 26, 2015, the International Agency for Research on Cancer of the World Health Organization reported that eating processed meat (e.g., bacon, ham, hot dogs, sausages) or red meat was linked to some cancers and classed them as Group 1 (carcinogenic to humans) and Group 2a (probably carcinogenic to humans) carcinogens respectively. There is some evidence that suggests that heme and nitrite are involved in the processes linking red and processed meat intake with colorectal cancer. Heme is present in particular in red meat and nitrite is used as curing salt in many processed meats.

Fiber, fruits and vegetables 
The evidence on the effect of dietary fiber on the risk of colon cancer is mixed with some types of evidence showing a benefit and others not. While eating fruit and vegetables has a benefit, it has less benefit on reducing cancer than once thought. Soy is rich in phytoestrogens. Phytoestrogens have weak estrogenic effects, but are naturally occurring compounds.

Two 2020 meta-analyses found that a high fiber intake was associated with a lower risk of both premenopausal and postmenopausal breast cancers and a higher survival rate in patients with breast cancer.

A 2014 study found fruit but not vegetables protected against upper gastrointestinal tract cancer. While fruit, vegetable and fiber protected against colorectal cancer and fiber protected against liver cancer.

Flavonoids 

Flavonoids (specifically flavonoids such as the catechins) are "the most common group of polyphenolic compounds in the human diet and are found ubiquitously in plants." While some studies have suggested flavonoids may have a role in cancer prevention, others have been inconclusive or suggested they may be harmful.

Mushrooms
According to Cancer Research UK, "there is currently no evidence that any type of mushroom or mushroom extract can prevent or cure cancer", although research into some species continues.

Dairy products

Saturated fat

Other
According to the American Cancer Society, there is no conclusive evidence for an anticancer effect of consuming soy products. 
Green tea consumption has no effect on cancer risk.
A 2016 meta-analysis showed that women and men who drank coffee had a lower risk of liver cancer. An umbrella review of meta-analyses found that coffee was associated with a lower risk of liver and endometrial cancer.
A 2014 systematic review found, "no firm evidence that vitamin D supplementation affects cancer occurrence in predominantly elderly community-dwelling women."

Mechanisms of action

Methionine metabolism

Although numerous cellular mechanisms are involved in food intake, many investigations over the past decades have pointed out defects in the methionine metabolic pathway as cause of carcinogenesis. For instance, deficiencies of the main dietary sources of methyl donors, methionine and choline, lead to the formation of liver cancer in rodents. Methionine is an essential amino acid that must be provided by dietary intake of proteins or methyl donors (choline and betaine found in beef, eggs and some vegetables). Assimilated methionine is transformed in S-adenosyl methionine (SAM) which is a key metabolite for polyamine synthesis, e.g. spermidine, and cysteine formation (see the figure on the right). Methionine breakdown products are also recycled back into methionine by homocysteine remethylation and methylthioadenosine (MTA) conversion (see the figure on the right). Vitamins B6, B12, folic acid and choline are essential cofactors for these reactions. SAM is the substrate for methylation reactions catalyzed by DNA, RNA and protein methyltransferases. 

The products of these reactions are methylated DNA, RNA or proteins and S-adenosylhomocysteine (SAH). SAH has a negative feedback on its own production as an inhibitor of methyltransferase enzymes. Therefore, SAM:SAH ratio directly regulates cellular methylation, whereas levels of vitamins B6, B12, folic acid and choline regulates indirectly the methylation state via the methionine metabolism cycle. A near ubiquitous feature of cancer is a maladaption of the methionine metabolic pathway in response to genetic or environmental conditions resulting in depletion of SAM and/or SAM-dependent methylation. Whether it is deficiency in enzymes such as methylthioadenosine phosphorylase, methionine-dependency of cancer cells, high levels of polyamine synthesis in cancer, or induction of cancer through a diet deprived of extrinsic methyl donors or enhanced in methylation inhibitors, tumor formation is strongly correlated with a decrease in levels of SAM in mice, rats and humans.

According to a 2012 review, the effect of methionine restriction on cancer has yet to be studied directly in humans and "there is still insufficient knowledge to give reliable nutritional advice".

AMPK 
AMPK is thought to be a major element or mechanism in cancer-related effects of diet. It modulates the activity of cellular survival signaling such as mTOR and Akt, leading to cell growth inhibition which is relevant to cancer growth. Targeting AMPK has become a novel strategy for cancer prevention and treatment. Potential complementary or preventive options under investigation include periods of caloric restriction and AMPK agonists (typically mTOR inhibitors). However, AMPK can also promote cancer in some settings.

See also 

 Alcohol and cancer
 Alcohol and breast cancer
 Acrylamide
 Bovine Meat and Milk Factors
 Food, Nutrition, Physical Activity and the Prevention of Cancer: a Global Perspective
 List of ineffective cancer treatments
 List of topics characterized as pseudoscience
 Microplastics ingested through diet
 Zero waste supermarket

References

External links 
 
 

Health effects of food and nutrition
Oncology
Cancer research